Mayank Prakash (born 1973) is a businessman based in the United Kingdom. Computer Weekly magazine described him as "the most influential person in UK IT" in their 2017 awards.

Qualifications 

Mayank Prakash holds an MBA from Manchester Business School, is a Wharton Fellow and an alumnus of Singularity University.

Career History 

Mayank Prakash started his career as a Graduate Engineer Trainee at the Hewlett-Packard. He worked in the HCL JV starting with the entrepreneurial Frontline Solutions start-up venture and was soon after selected to join the Senior Management Trainee Programme and deputed to incubate ERP implementation capabilities working with the Big 4 Consulting firms at HCL Tech.

Prakash was the International CIO of Avaya, then the Group CIO of iSoft and later the CIO of Sage Group in UK. Prakash was hired by Morgan Stanley leading Tech and Data team of Morgan Stanley Wealth and Asset Management and as Director of Morgan Stanley Advantage Services.

In 2014, Prakash left Morgan Stanley to join the Department for Work and Pensions as the Director General in charge of technology, replacing Andy Nelson. In this role, Prakash combines his predecessor's job as CIO with business transformation, security and data responsibilities, and worked directly for Sir Robert Devereux.

Subsequently, Mayank joined FTSE100 Centrica as the Chief Consumer Digital and Information Officer.

Current roles 

Prakash joined the board of Uber as a Non Exec Director.

As Centrica sold its North American business, Prakash was head hunted to join UK's largest wealth and professional services group Evelyn Partners managing £57bn assets as the Group CTO and then promoted to become the Group Chief Operations Officer. Prakash is also the Director on the board of UK's fastest growing £10 bn funding business Evelyn Partners Fund Solutions Limited.

He was selected as the Deputy President of the British Computing Society in 2021 and the President in 2022. The British Computing Society is the Chartered Institute for Technology. Prakash is the chair of the board and also serves on the nominations and remuneration committee of the Trustee Board.

Prakash is also the Chair of PIMFA WealthTech Advisory Council.

References 

Technology business executives
1973 births
Living people
British civil servants
Chief information officers
Chief digital officers
Alumni of the Manchester Business School